The Grand Prix du Disque for Instrumental and Symphonic Music is awarded by the Académie Charles Cros, L'Abbaye, 02570 Chézy sur Marne, France.

Winners
The following is a partial list of winners:

1960

1961
Jeanne Demessieux, organ, for her world-premiere recording of the complete organ works by César Franck.
1965
Herbert Schachtschneider (Waldemar), Inge Borkh (Tove), Hertha Töpper (Waldtaube), Kieth Engen (Bauer), Lorenz Fehenberger (Klaus-Narr), Hans Herbert-Fiedler (narrator), the Bavarian Radio Chorus directed by chorusmaster Wolfgang Schubert conducted by Rafael Kubelík for their recording of Gurre-Lieder by Arnold Schoenberg.
2002
Truls Mørk, cello, and R. Capuçon and the Orchestre Philharmonique de Radio France directed by Myung-whun Chung for their recording of works by Henri Dutilleux.
2004
Éric Le Sage and Frank Braley, pianos, with the Philharmonic Orchestra of Liège conducted by Stéphane Denève for their recording of Francis Poulenc: Concerto for Two Pianos and Concerto for Piano.
2005
Rian Waul, piano, and the Ensemble Anima Eterna, conducted by Jos van Immerseel for their recording of Franz Liszt works for orchestra.
Christophe Desjardins, alto, and the Collegium Novum Zürich and the Basler Madrigalisten, directed by J. Nott for their album Voix d'Alto.

See also
Grand Prix du Disque

Instrumental and Symphonic Music
Classical music awards